Mats Linder is a Swedish para-alpine skier. He represented Sweden at the 1988 Winter Paralympics, at the 1992 Winter Paralympics and at the 1994 Winter Paralympics. He won the silver medal in the Men's Giant Slalom B1 event and the silver medal in the Men's Downhill B1 event at the 1988 Winter Paralympics. He also won the bronze medal in the Men's Super-G B1 event at the 1992 Winter Paralympics.

See also 
 List of Paralympic medalists in alpine skiing

References 

Living people
Year of birth missing (living people)
Place of birth missing (living people)
Paralympic alpine skiers of Sweden
Alpine skiers at the 1988 Winter Paralympics
Alpine skiers at the 1992 Winter Paralympics
Alpine skiers at the 1994 Winter Paralympics
Medalists at the 1988 Winter Paralympics
Medalists at the 1992 Winter Paralympics
Paralympic silver medalists for Sweden
Paralympic bronze medalists for Sweden
Paralympic medalists in alpine skiing
20th-century Swedish people